The following is a list of notable deaths in November 2003.

Entries for each day are listed alphabetically by surname. A typical entry lists information in the following sequence:
 Name, age, country of citizenship at birth, subsequent country of citizenship (if applicable), reason for notability, cause of death (if known), and reference.

November 2003

1
Carolyn Baylies, 56, American academic and activist, cancer.
Michael DeSisto, 64, American educator, cerebral hemorrhage.
W. Brian Harland, 86, British geologist.
Colin Hayes, 83, British artist.
Sonny Senerchia, 72, American baseball player (Pittsburgh Pirates) and college baseball coach (Monmouth University), motorcycle accident.
Daishiro Yoshimura, 56, Japanese football player and manager, intracranial hemorrhage.

2
Bukari Adama, 77, Ghanaian politician and minister of state.
Christabel Bielenberg, 94, British writer, Nazi Germany memoir: The Past is Myself (BBC-TV adaptation: Christabel).
William F. Borgmann, 90, American football player and coach.
Nati Kaji, 77, Nepali singer and songwriter.
Iris Kelso, 76, Mississippi-born journalist.
Frank McCloskey, 64, Indiana Congressman (Indiana's 8th district) from 1983 to 1995, bladder cancer
Jimmy Quillen, 87, American politician (U.S. Representative for Tennessee's 1st congressional district).
Mariya Shkarletova, 78, Russian field medic during World War II.
Frederic Vester, 77, German cybernetician.
Cliff Young, 81, Australian potato farmer and long distance runner, won Sydney to Melbourne Ultramarathon in 1983 at 61, cancer.

3
Derk Bodde, 94, American sinologist.
Aaron Bridgers, 85, American-French jazz pianist, featured in the 1961 Paul Newman film Paris Blues.
Rasul Gamzatov, 80, Avarian/Soviet/Russian poet, called the "People's poet of Dagestan".
A. James Manchin, 76, American politician, Secretary of State and State Treasurer for West Virginia.
Narendra Prasad, 57, Indian (Malayalam) film actor, professor and writer.

4
Lotte Berk, 90, German-English dancer and teacher, created Barre fitness classes.
Charles Causley, 86, British poet.
Ken Gampu, 74, South African actor.
Rachel de Queiroz, 92, Brazilian writer and journalist.
R. M. Williams, 95, Australian bushwear manufacturer, known for their handcrafted riding boots.
Richard Wollheim, 80, British philosopher and an authority on psychoanalysis and art.

5
David Bar-Ilan, 73, Israeli concert pianist, journalist and political aide (Benjamin Netanyahu).
Hugh H. Bownes, 83, American judge (Senior Judge of the United States Court of Appeals for the First Circuit).
Dorothy Fay, 88, American actress.
Bobby Hatfield, 63, half of the singing duo the Righteous Brothers.
Zaim Muzaferija, 80, Bosnian actor and poet.
Dernell Stenson, 25, American baseball player (Cincinnati Reds), killed during robbery.

6
Just Betzer, 59, Danish film producer (Babette's Feast: 1988 Academy Award for Best Foreign-Language Film).
Crash Holly, 32, American professional wrestler.
Spider Jorgensen, 84, American baseball player (Brooklyn Dodgers, New York Giants).
Rie Mastenbroek, 84, Dutch swimmer (1936 Summer Olympics medals: gold:100m, gold:400m, gold:4x100m, silver:100m).
Eduardo Palomo, 41, Mexican actor, heart attack.
Rudolf Schönbeck, 84, German football player.
Lubor J. Zink, 83, Czech-Canadian columnist, known for his anti-communism columns.

7
James L. Bentley, 76, American politician, Comptroller General of Georgia.
Jack Durrance, 91, American rock climber and mountaineer.
Donald Griffin, 88, American professor of zoology.
Foo Foo Lammar, 66, British drag queen.

8
Eugene Barrett, 72, American serial killer.
C. Z. Guest, 83, American socialite.
Malcolm Douglas-Pennant, 6th Baron Penrhyn, 95, British soldier and aristocrat.
Michael Pollock, 82, American opera singer.
T. A. Venkitasubramanian, 79, Indian biochemist.
Joseph P. Williams, 88, American banker, created BankAmericard, the first successful all-purpose credit card.

9
Buddy Arnold, 77, American jazz saxophonist.
Stephen Benton, 61, American scientist, teacher and artist, inventor of the rainbow hologram.
Art Carney, 85, American actor (The Honeymooners, Harry and Tonto, The Late Show).
Gordon Onslow Ford, 90, British-born American surrealist painter.
David Gray, 81, English cricketer.
Mario Merz, 78, Italian artist.
Edith Nash, 90, American educator and poet, co-founder and director of Georgetown Day School.

10
Margaret Armen, 82, American television screenwriter (The Rifleman, The Big Valley, Star Trek, Barnaby Jones).
Canaan Banana, 67, Zimbabwean politician and minister, first president of independent Zimbabwe.
June Beebe, 90, American professional golfer, won the Women's Western Open in 1931 and 1933.
Irv Kupcinet, 91, American columnist, television personality.
Morten Lange, 83, Danish mycologist and politician.
Jed Williams, 51, Welsh jazz journalist and artistic director of the Brecon Jazz Festival.

11
Heinz von Allmen, 90, Swiss Alpine skier.
Andrei Bolibrukh, 53, Soviet (Russian) mathematician, known for his work on ordinary differential equations.
Robert Brown, 82, British actor (spy boss M in four James Bond films).
Peter Gallagher, 66, Australian rugby league player.
Paul Janssen, 77, Belgian physician and founder of Janssen Pharmaceutica.
Miquel Martí i Pol, 74, Catalan poet.
Lloyd Pettit, 76, American sportscaster.
Shmuel Shtrikman, 73, Israeli physicist.
Arthur Stewart-Cox, 78, British army general.
Don Taylor, 67, British theatre and television director.
Harold Walker, Baron Walker of Doncaster, 76, British politician (MP for Doncaster and Doncaster Central).
George Wallace, Baron Wallace of Coslany, 97, British politician and life peer (Member of Parliament for Chislehurst, Norwich North).

12
Jonathan Brandis, 27, American actor (seaQuest DSV, It, Sidekicks), suicide by hanging.
Whitfield Cook, 94, American writer of screenplays, stage plays, short stories and novels.
Dola de Jong, 92, Dutch-American dancer and writer.
Kay E. Kuter, 78, American actor.
Penny Singleton, 95, American actress, singer and dancer.
John Tartaglione, 82, American comic book artist.
Tony Thompson, 48, American drummer for The Power Station, kidney cancer.

13
B. M. Gafoor, 61, Indian cartoonist and comic artist, heart attack.
Ray Harris, 76, American rockability musician and songwriter.
Nobuo Okishio, 76, Japanese Marxian economist.
Andrew Vázsonyi, 87, Hungarian-American mathematician, founder of The Institute of Management Sciences.
Kellie Waymire, 36, American actress (Star Trek: Enterprise, Six Feet Under), cardiac arrest.

14
Norm Baxter, 94, Australian politician.
Pierre Camonin, 100, French organist and composer.
Giles Gordon, 63, Scottish literary agent and writer.
Pete Rawlings, 66, American politician.
Gene Anthony Ray, 41, American actor, dancer, and choreographer, complications of a stroke.
Tim Vigors, 82, British World War II fighter pilot and owner of Coolmore Stud.

15
Earl Battey, 68, American baseball player (Chicago White Sox, Washington Senators, Minnesota Twins).
Mohamed Choukri, 68, Moroccan author and novelist.
Ray Lewis, 93, first Canadian-born black Olympic medalist.
Dorothy Loudon, 70, American actress.
John Stamper, 77, British aeronautical engineer.
Laurence Tisch, 80, American billionaire, head of Loews Corporation and CBS television network.
James D. Weaver, 83, American politician (U.S. Representative for Pennsylvania's 24th congressional district).
Speedy West, 79, American pedal steel guitarist and record producer.
Ned Wulk, 83, American basketball coach (Arizona State University from 1958 to 1982) and baseball coach.

16
Fernanda Bullano, 89, Italian sprinter (women's 4 × 100 metres relay at the 1936 Summer Olympics).
Walt Conley, 74, American folk singer, Hollywood actor, and voice actor, stroke.
Lucien Dahdah, 74, Lebanese academic, media executive and politician.
Thomas B. Fitzpatrick, 83, American dermatologist.
Arihiro Fukuda, 40, Japanese associate professor and author of Sovereignty and the Sword.
Bettina Goislard, 29, French UNHCR relief worker, killed by Taliban militants.
Catalino Macaraig Jr., 76, Filipino public servant.
Albert Nozaki, 91, Japanese-American art director (The War of the Worlds, The Ten Commandments)

17
Gerry Adams, Sr, 77, Irish Republican Army volunteer, father of Gerry Adams.
Surjit Bindrakhia, 41, Indian singer, cardiac arrest.
Arthur Conley, 58, American soul singer.
Don Gibson, 75, American singer-songwriter.
Damian Mills, 24, Canadian international cricketer, died in his sleep.
Robert Passantino, 52, American author and journalist, cardiac arrest.
Pete Taylor, 75, American baseball player (St. Louis Browns).

18
Vivian Bonnell, 79, Antiguan actress (House of Flowers, For Pete's Sake, Ghost, Sanford and Son).
Ken Brett, 55, American baseball player, brother of George Brett.
Patricia Broderick, 78, American playwright (Infinity) and painter, mother of Matthew Broderick, cancer.
Anton Burg, 99, American chemist, professor and an expert on boron and the synthesis of boron compounds.
Michael Kamen, 55, American composer (Die Hard, Band of Brothers, 101 Dalmatians).
Braulio Sánchez Fuentes, 81, Mexican Roman Catholic prelate, territorial prelate of Mixes (1970–2000).

19
Gillian Barge, 63, English actress (The Cherry Orchard, Measure For Measure, The Winter's Tale).
Christfried Berger, 65, German protestant theologian.
Harry Buffington, 84, American professional football player (Oklahoma State, New York Giants, Brooklyn Dodgers).
William B. Macomber Jr., American diplomat and president of The Metropolitan Museum of Art.
Greg Ridley, 56, English rock artist, complications following pneumonia.
Robert E. Thompson, 82, American political journalist.
Bill Young, 86, Australian politician (Tasmanian House of Assembly for Franklin).

20
Robert Addie, 43, English actor (Excalibur, Robin of Sherwood, Another Country, Dutch Girls, Merlin).
Theo Berger, 62, German criminal.
Ernest Radcliffe Bond, 84, British police commissioner, head of the Metropolitan Police Anti-Terrorist Branch.
David Dacko, 73, first president of the Central African Republic.
Eugene Kleiner, 80, entrepreneur and co-founder of Kleiner, Perkins, Caufield & Byers venture capital firm.
Mary Jane Russell, 77, American photographic fashion model, pulmonary fibrosis.
Roger Short, 58, British diplomat, consul-general in Istanbul.
Jim Siedow, 83, American actor.
Kerem Yilmazer, 58, Turkish actor.

21
Bill Haarlow, 90, American basketball player.
Ronald Moore, 89, Canadian politician.
Emil Pažický, 76, Slovak football player.
Teddy Randazzo, 68, American singer-songwriter.
Edward R. Schowalter Jr., 75, United States Army officer and recipient of the Medal of Honor.

22
Iosif Budahazi, 56, Romanian fencer (men's individual sabre, men's team sabre at the 1972 Summer Olympics).
Joe Just, 87, American baseball player (Cincinnati Reds).
Yuri Khukhrov, 71, Russian Soviet realist painter and graphic artist.
George Peoples, 43, American football player (Dallas Cowboys, New England Patriots, Tampa Bay Buccaneers).
Dru Sjodin, 22, American murder victim.
William Waterhouse, 86, Canadian violinist and music teacher.

23
Sylvia Bernstein, 88, American civil rights and civil liberties activist.
Patricia Burke, 86, English singer and actress (Lisbon Story, The Day the Fish Came Out, The Clitheroe Kid).
Nick Carter, 79, New Zealand racing cyclist (men's individual road race at the 1948 Summer Olympics).
Jack Fitzgerald, 73, Irish footballer.
Patrick Jansen, 82, Indian field hockey player (gold medal in field hockey at the 1948 Summer Olympics).
Margaret Singer, 82, American clinical psychologist and researcher.
W. Fred Turner, 81, American attorney.

24
Lu'ay al-Atassi, 76/7, Syrian army commander and politician, President (1963).
Hesba Fay Brinsmead, 81, Australian author of books for children and young adults (Pastures of the Blue Crane).
George Dunlap, 94, American golfer.
Hugh Kenner, 80, Canadian literary critic.
Ralph Wilson Nimmons Jr., 65, American judge (U.S. District Judge of the U.S. District Court for the Middle District of Florida).
Michael Small, 64, American film score composer.
Floquet de Neu, 38-40, Spanish only albino western lowland gorilla in the world.
Warren Spahn, 82, American baseball pitcher (Milwaukee Braves) and member of the MLB Hall of Fame.

25
Frank B. Colton, 80, American chemist.
Shulamith Hareven, 73, Israeli writer and essayist.
Gus W. Weiss, 72, American White House policy advisor on technology, intelligence and economic affairs.
Zhang Honggen, 67, Chinese football player and coach.

26
Ramona Barnes, 65, American politician (Speaker of the Alaska House of Representatives).
Sadegh Khalkhali, 77, Iranian Shia cleric and ayatollah.
Lionel Ngakane, 75, South African filmmaker and actor (The Mark of the Hawk, The Squeeze).
Gordon Reid, 64, Scottish actor.
Soulja Slim, 26, American rapper.
Stefan Wul, 81, French science fiction writer, his novel Oms en série used as the basis for Fantastic Planet.
Brian Wybourne, 68, New Zealand physicist, known for his groundbreaking work on the energy levels of rare-earth ions.

27
Satyendra Dubey, 30, Indian Engineering Service officer, assassinated.
R. D. Lawrence, 82, Canadian naturalist and wildlife author.
Will Quadflieg, 89, German actor.
Marjorie Reeves, 98, British historian and educationalist.

28
Ted Bates, 85, British footballer and manager.
Harold von Braunhut, 77, American marketer and creator of Amazing Sea-Monkeys.
Barry Broadfoot, 77, Canadian journalist, oral historian and best-selling author.
Mihkel Mathiesen, 85, Estonian politician.
Thekra, 45, Tunisian singer, shot.

29
Norman Burton, 79, American actor (Diamonds Are Forever, The Towering Inferno, The New Adventures of Wonder Woman).
Tony Canadeo, 84, American football player (Green Bay Packers) and member of the Pro Football Hall of Fame.
Jim Carlin, 85, American baseball player (Philadelphia Phillies).
Jesse Carver, 92, English football player and manager.
Jan-Magnus Jansson, 81, Finnish politician. chairman of the Swedish People's Party of Finland.
Len Lawson, Australian comic book creator and convicted murderer.
Moondog Spot, 51, American professional wrestler.
Rudi Martinus van Dijk, 71, Dutch composer. 
Ethel Winant, 81, American first woman television executive (vice-president of CBS).

30
Valentin Arbakov, 51, Russian chess grandmaster, tied for 1981 Moscow championship.
Earl Bellamy, 86, American film and television director (Leave It to Beaver, The Lone Ranger, I Spy, M*A*S*H).
Jack Brewer, 85, American baseball player (New York Giants).
Barber B. Conable, 81, New York Congressman, president of the World Bank from 1986–1991.
Gertrude Ederle, 98, American  swimmer and first woman to swim the English Channel (1926).
Granville Slack, 97, British judge and politician.

References 

2003-11
 11